In (mostly non-American) politics, "poodle" is an insult used to describe any politician who obediently or passively follows the lead of others. It is considered to be equivalent to lackey. Usage of the term is thought to relate to the passive and obedient nature of the dog breed. Colette Avital unsuccessfully tried to have the term's use banned from the Knesset in June 2001.

During the 2000, it was used against Tony Blair with regard to his close relationship with George W. Bush and the involvement of the United Kingdom in the Iraq War. The singer George Michael infamously used it in his song "Shoot the Dog" in July 2002, the video of which showed Blair as the "poodle" on the lawn of the White House. However, it has somewhat of a longer history as a label to criticise British Prime Ministers who are perceived to be too close to the United States.

See also
 Political insult
 Sycophancy

References

Political slurs for people